Erik Frandsen (12 November 1923 – 19 June 1974) was a Danish field hockey player. He competed in the men's tournament at the 1960 Summer Olympics.

References

External links
 

1923 births
1974 deaths
Danish male field hockey players
Olympic field hockey players of Denmark
Field hockey players at the 1960 Summer Olympics
Sportspeople from Copenhagen